In telecommunication, frequency-change signaling is a  telegraph signaling method in which one or more particular frequencies correspond to each desired signaling condition of a telegraph code.  The transition from one set of frequencies to the other may be a continuous or a discontinuous change in the frequency or phase.

See also
Frequency-shift keying
Frequency modulation

References

Data transmission
Telegraphy